"You Better You Bet" is a song by British rock band the Who, appearing as the first track on their 1981 album Face Dances. It is sung by frontman Roger Daltrey with backing vocals from Pete Townshend and bassist John Entwistle. Townshend's guitar part is performed on a Rickenbacker 360/12.

"You Better You Bet" became a hit and one of the Who's most recognizable songs. It was the last single by the band that reached the top 20 on the Billboard Hot 100, reaching No. 18. The track was at No. 1 on the Billboard Top Tracks chart for five weeks beginning 4 April 1981. It was also their last single to hit the top ten in the UK, peaking at No. 9.

Background
"You Better You Bet" was written by Pete Townshend as a love song for his girlfriend at the time: "I developed ['You Better You Bet'] over several weeks of clubbing and partying. I had gone through a lean period in my marriage and was seeing the daughter of a friend of mine. I wanted it to be a good song because the girl I wrote it for is one of the best people on the planet."  Townshend also commented: You Better You Bet' was a very spontaneous lyric. A fairly spontaneous, peppy song; it's a pop song, really, it's just a pop song."

Roger Daltrey praised the song's vocal melody, comparing it to Elvis Presley. He stated, "A wonderful, wonderful song. The way the vocal bounces, it always reminds me of Elvis." Daltrey also noted, "'You Better You Bet' is still one of my favourite songs of all."

The song references the group T. Rex, as well as the group's own album Who's Next (1971), with the line: "I drunk myself blind to the sound of old T. Rex... and Who's Next." The synthesizer riff is performed on a Yamaha E70 home organ.

Release
"You Better You Bet" was released as the first single from Face Dances in February 1981, backed with the John Entwistle-penned "The Quiet One". The single peaked at number 9 in the UK; in the U.S., it reached number 18. The single's relative underperformance is thought to have been because Warner Bros. Records had decided to boycott independent promoters in America, which resulted in less airplay for the track. Pete Townshend reflected on the single's success: "A surprise hit single for us... We even went back on Top of the Pops."

Reception
"You Better You Bet" has seen positive critical reception since its release.  Record World said that "flashy electronic keyboards usher in Roger Daltrey's souped up pop vocal." Rolling Stone ranked the song as the band's 32nd-best, stating, "Tough and to the point, 'You Better You Bet' reflects the way Townshend's enthusiasm for punk rock was tightening his songwriting. Addressed to his new girlfriend, it also hits a note of sly nostalgia when Daltrey sings about getting drunk "to the sound of old T. Rex. Mike DeGagne of AllMusic praised the song as "arguably the strongest track on Face Dances" and concluded, "The Who's use of synthesizers fit in perfectly with the beginning of the decade, while the song's alliterative chorus and clever use of sarcasm and wit gave it lyrical sustenance."

Music video
A music video for the song was produced in black and white, featuring the band and keyboardist John Bundrick playing onstage. Upon the launch of MTV on 1 August 1981, it was the fourth video played; it was also the 55th, 98th, 141st, and 191st video to be aired, becoming during that sequence the first video seen multiple times on the channel.

Personnel 
 Roger Daltrey – lead vocals
 Pete Townshend – guitar, keyboards, backing vocals
 John Entwistle – bass, backing vocals
 Kenney Jones – drums

Additional musicians
 John "Rabbit" Bundrick – keyboards

Charts

Weekly charts

Year-end charts

See also
List of Billboard Mainstream Rock number-one songs of the 1980s

References

1980 songs
1981 singles
The Who songs
Songs written by Pete Townshend
Song recordings produced by Bill Szymczyk
British new wave songs
Warner Records singles
Polydor Records singles
Black-and-white music videos